Sirba may refer to:

Paul Sirba (1960 – 2019), American prelate of the Roman Catholic Church
Marcel Sîrba (born 1957), Romanian boxer

Sârbă or sîrba, Romanian folk dance
Sirba River, tributary of the Niger River in western Africa